Harrison County is a county in the U.S. state of West Virginia. As of the 2020 census, the population was 65,921. Its county seat is Clarksburg.

Harrison County is part of the Clarksburg, WV Micropolitan Statistical Area.

History
Indigenous peoples lived in the area that would become Harrison County for thousands of years. The Oak Mounds outside Clarksburg were built by the Hopewell culture mound builders during the first millennium CE.

18th century
White trappers visited the area that is now Harrison County as early as the 1760s. Some traded with the Native Americans of the area. The Virginia Colony claimed the area as part of its vast Augusta County. The first permanent settler in the area was hunter and trapper John Simpson, who erected a cabin at the mouth of Elk Creek on the West Fork River in 1763 or '64. Simpson's name remains on "Simpson's Creek" (its mouth is about 9 miles downstream from present Clarksburg). Settler Daniel Davisson (1748-1819), from New Jersey, claimed the land upon which present-day Clarksburg, Harrison County, was formed in 1773; the area was re-designated as part of Monongalia County, Virginia three years later. Simpson's story did not end well. According to a 19th-century local historian, he ...

... continued to hunt and trap for a year without encountering any other human being. In 1765, he went to the South Branch to dispose of a stock of skins and furs, and returning to his camp, remained until permanent settlements were made in the vicinity. ... Simpson's cabin was located about one mile from Clarksburg, on the west side of the West Fork River ... Simpson became indebted to a man named Cottrial to the amount of "one quart of salt" (a precious article at the time), which he agreed to pay, either in money or salt, upon his return from Winchester, whither he was going to dispose of a stock of skins and furs. Upon his return, a dispute arose between them, regarding the payment, and Cottrial, in the heat of passion, hastened from the house, and grasping Daniel Davisson's gun, which stood leaning against the cabin, took aim through the space between the logs, and attempted to shoot Simpson. The latter, however, was too quick for him, and springing outside, grasped the gun from Cottrial's hands and killed him. This was the first tragedy of this nature in the vicinity.

Harrison County was organized in 1784, with territory partitioned from Monongalia County. It was named for Benjamin Harrison V, who had recently retired as the Governor of Virginia. (He was the father of William Henry Harrison, 9th President of the United States and great-grandfather of Benjamin Harrison, 23rd president.) Over the next 72 years, all of eight present-day West Virginia counties and parts of ten others were formed from this original Harrison County.

The first meeting of the Harrison County court was held on July 20, 1784, at the home of George Jackson. The group designated the county seat as Clarksburg. The town, named for explorer General George Rogers Clark (1752–1818), was chartered by the Virginia General Assembly in October 1785, and it was incorporated in 1795.

19th century

Clarksburg's first newspaper, The By-Stander, began publication in 1810. Construction of the Northwestern Turnpike connecting Winchester and Parkersburg, reached the town in 1836, stimulating development by connecting it to other markets. Clarksburg's economic development was also helped by the arrival of the Baltimore and Ohio Railroad in 1856. The railroad was instrumental in the development of the local coal mining industry during the late 1800s and early 1900s.

In 1863, West Virginia's counties were divided into civil townships, with the intention of encouraging local government.  This proved impractical in the heavily rural state, and in 1872 the townships were converted into magisterial districts.  Harrison County was divided into ten districts: Clark, Clay, Coal, Eagle, Elk, Grant, Sardis, Simpson, Tenmile, and Union.  These districts remained stable for a century, but in the 1970s they were consolidated to form six new districts: North Clarksburg, South Clarksburg, Suburban, Northern, Southeast, and Southwest.  In the 1980s, North and South Clarksburg Districts became North Urban and South Urban.  In the 1990s, the Southeast and Suburban Districts were discontinued, and replaced by the Eastern and Southern Districts.

Geography
The county terrain consists of low rolling hills, largely wooded, etched by drainages and creeks. The terrain slopes to the West Fork River valley from both east and west borders, and also generally slopes to the north. Its highest point is on its south corner, at 1,736' (529m) ASL. The county is drained by the north-flowing West Fork River and its tributaries, including Tenmile Creek, Simpson Creek, and Elk Creek.

Major highways

  Interstate 79
  U.S. Route 19
  U.S. Route 50
  West Virginia Route 20
  West Virginia Route 23
  West Virginia Route 57
  West Virginia Route 58
  West Virginia Route 76
  West Virginia Route 98
  West Virginia Route 131
  West Virginia Route 270
  West Virginia Route 279

Airports

 North Central West Virginia Airport - northeast of Bridgeport
 Wade F. Maley Field - northeast of Shinnston

Adjacent counties

 Marion County - north
 Taylor County - east
 Barbour County - southeast
 Upshur County - south
 Lewis County - southwest
 Doddridge County - west
 Wetzel County - northwest

Protected areas
 Watters Smith State Park

Lakes

 Deegan Lake
 Lake Floyd
 Maple Lake
 Mine 95 Water Supply Reservoir
 Oral Lake
 Salem Auxiliary Lake

Demographics

2020 census 
As of the 2020 census, there were 65,921 people and 26,143 households residing in the county. There were 30,480 housing units in Harrison County. The racial makeup of the city was 91.5% White, 1.7% African American, 0.7% Asian, 0.2% Native American, 0.6% from other races, and 5.2% from two or more races. Hispanics or Latinos of any race were 2.1% of the population.

There were 26,143 households, of which 47.3% were married couples living together,  27.6% had a female householder with no spouse present,  19.5% had a male householder with no spouse present. The average household and family size was 3.19. The median age in the city was 42.4 years. The median income for a household in the city was $51,553 and the poverty rate was 14.3%.

2010 census
As of the census of 2010, there were 69,099 people, 28,533 households, and 18,992 families in the county. The population density was 166/sqmi (64.1/km2). There were 31,431 housing units at an average density of 75.6/sqmi (29.2/km2). The racial makeup of the county was 96.0% white, 1.6% black or African American, 0.5% Asian, 0.2% American Indian, 0.2% from other races, and 1.5% from two or more races. Those of Hispanic or Latino origin made up 1.3% of the population. In terms of ancestry, 19.8% were German, 19.0% were American, 18.3% were Irish, 13.2% were English, and 10.4% were Italian.

Of the 28,533 households, 30.0% had children under the age of 18 living with them, 49.7% were married couples living together, 11.9% had a female householder with no husband present, 33.4% were non-families, and 28.3% of all households were made up of individuals. The average household size was 2.39 and the average family size was 2.92. The median age was 41.8 years.

The median income for a household in the county was $39,191 and the median income for a family was $46,882. Males had a median income of $42,615 versus $28,867 for females. The per capita income for the county was $21,010. About 15.0% of families and 18.9% of the population were below the poverty line, including 29.0% of those under age 18 and 9.1% of those age 65 or over.

2000 census
As of the census of 2000, there were 68,652 people, 27,867 households, and 19,088 families in the county. The population density was 165/sqmi (63.7/km2). There were 31,112 housing units at an average density of 74.8/sqmi (28.9/km2). The racial makeup of the county was 96.55% White, 1.61% Black or African American, 0.15% Native American, 0.59% Asian, 0.03% Pacific Islander, 0.21% from other races, and 0.86% from two or more races. 0.96% of the population were Hispanic or Latino of any race.

There were 27,867 households, out of which 29.70% had children under the age of 18 living with them, 53.30% were  living together, 11.40% had a female householder with no husband present, and 31.50% were non-families. 27.70% of all households were made up of individuals, and 13.20% had someone living alone who was 65 years of age or older. The average household size was 2.42 and the average family size was 2.94.

The county population contained 23.10% under the age of 18, 8.30% from 18 to 24, 27.50% from 25 to 44, 24.50% from 45 to 64, and 16.60% who were 65 years of age or older. The median age was 39 years. For every 100 females, there were 91.80 males. For every 100 females age 18 and over, there were 88.20 males.

The median income for a household in the county was $30,562, and the median income for a family was $36,870. Males had a median income of $30,721 versus $22,110 for females. The per capita income for the county was $16,810.  About 13.60% of families and 17.20% of the population were below the poverty line, including 24.10% of those under age 18 and 9.40% of those age 65 or over.

Communities

Cities

 Bridgeport
 Clarksburg (county seat)
 Salem
 Shinnston
 Stonewood

Towns

 Anmoore
 Lost Creek
 Lumberport
 Nutter Fort
 West Milford

Magisterial Districts

Eastern
Northern
North Urban
Southern
South Urban
Southwest

Census-designated places

 Despard
 East View
 Enterprise
 Gypsy
 Hepzibah
 Reynoldsville
 Spelter
 Wallace
 Wolf Summit

Charles Pointe Master-Planned Community
Harrison County is the site of a master-planned community, Charles Pointe, which is currently under construction in the city of Bridgeport and comprises  that will combine commercial, residential, and recreational areas into one master-planned community. Adjacent to Charles Pointe, the United Hospital Center, a $278 million state-of-the-art medical facility. Across from the United Hospital Center site, White Oaks, a planned business community is also under construction, and will support the hospital and the FBI CJIS complex, which is also located near the White Oaks site. This area of  West Virginia's Interstate 79 is considered part of a "High Tech Corridor."

Politics
During the 20th century Harrison County voters tended Democratic. However, since 2000 the county has selected the Republican Party candidate in every national election (as of 2020).

Historical landmarks

 Fletcher Covered Bridge
 Kelly Miller High School
 Oak Mounds
 Simpson Creek Covered Bridge
 The Waldomore

Notable people
 John S. Carlile, Unionist Virginia Senator, 1861 to 1865.
 John W. Davis, Democratic Party candidate for President in 1924
 Guy Goff, Republican Party United States Senator
 Joseph Johnson, 32nd Governor of the Commonwealth of Virginia, 1852 to 1856.
 Harry Powers, lonely hearts serial killer hanged in 1932. Basis for The Night of the Hunter by Davis Grubb.
 Jennings Randolph, U.S. Representative from 1933 to 1947 and U.S. Senator from 1958 to 1985.
 Cyrus Vance, U.S. Secretary of State under President Carter, Deputy Secretary of Defense under President Johnson, and Secretary of the Army under President Kennedy.

See also
 Center Branch Wildlife Management Area
 Central West Virginia Transportation Authority
 North Bend Rail Trail
 Watters Smith Memorial State Park
 National Register of Historic Places listings in Harrison County, West Virginia

Footnotes

References

External links
 Harrison County Chamber of Commerce
 Harrison County Commission
 Harrison County Development Authority
 Harrison County Genealogical Society
 Harrison County Schools
 WVGenWeb Harrison County

 
1784 establishments in Virginia
Northwestern Turnpike
Clarksburg micropolitan area
Populated places established in 1784
Counties of Appalachia